Schneider flow describes the axisymmetric outer flow induced by a laminar or turbulent jet having a large jet Reynolds number or by a laminar plume with a large Grashof number, in the case where the fluid domain is bounded by a wall. When the jet Reynolds number or the plume Grashof number is large, the full flow field constitutes two regions of different extent: a thin boundary-layer flow that may identified as the jet or as the plume and a slowly moving fluid in the large outer region encompassing the jet or the plume. The Schneider flow describing the latter motion is an exact solution of the Navier-Stokes equations, discovered by Wilhelm Schneider in 1981. The solution was discovered also by A. A. Golubinskii and V. V. Sychev in 1979, however, was never applied to flows entrained by jets. The solution is an extension of Taylor's potential flow solution to arbitrary Reynolds number.

Mathematical description
For laminar or turbulent jets and for laminar plumes, the volumetric entertainment rate per unit axial length is constant as can be seen from the solution of Schlichting jet and Yih plume. Thus, the jet or plume can be considered as a line sink that drives the motion in the outer region, as was first done by G. I. Taylor. Prior to Schneider, it was assumed that this outer fluid motion is also a large Reynolds number flow, hence the outer fluid motion is assumed to be a potential flow solution, which was solved by G. I. Taylor in 1958. For turbulent plume, the entrainment is not constant, nevertheless, the outer fluid is still governed by Taylors solution.

Though Taylor's solution is still true for turbulent jet, for laminar jet or laminar plume, the effective Reynolds number for outer fluid is found to be of order unity since the entertainment by the sink in these cases is such that the flow is not inviscid. In this case, full Navier-Stokes equations has to be solved for the outer fluid motion and at the same time, since the fluid is bounded from the bottom by a solid wall, the solution has to satisfy the non-slip condition. Schneider obtained a self-similar solution for this outer fluid motion, which naturally reduced to Taylor's potential flow solution as the entrainment rate by the line sink is increased.

Suppose a conical wall of semi-angle  with polar axis along the cone-axis and assume the vertex of the solid cone sits at the origin of the spherical coordinates  extending along the negative axis. Now, put the line sink along the positive side of the polar axis. Set this way,  represents the common case of flat wall with jet or plume emerging from the origin. The case  corresponds to jet/plume issuing from a thin injector. The usual technique to study the flow is to introduce the Stokes stream function  such that

For turbulent jet, this constant is the order of the jet Reynolds number, which is a large number.

The above equation can easily be reduced to a Riccati equation by integrating thrice, a procedure that is same as in the Landau–Squire jet (main difference between Landau-Squire jet and the current problem are the boundary conditions). The boundary conditions on the conical wall  become

and along the line sink , we have

The problem has been solved numerically from here.

Taylor's potential flow
For turbulent jet, the linear terms in the equation can be neglected everywhere except near a small boundary layer along the wall. Then neglecting the non-slip conditions at the wall, the solution is given by 

In the case of axisymmetric turbulent plumes where the entrainment rate per unit axial length of the plume increases like , Taylor's solution is given by  where  is a constant,  is the specific buoyancy flux and 

in which  denotes the associated Legendre function of the first kind with degree  and order .

Other considerations
The exact solution of the Navier-Stokes solutions was verified experimentally by Zauner in 1985. Further analysis showed that the axial momentum flux decays slowly along the axis unlike the Schlichting jet solution and it is found that the Schneider flow becomes invalid when distance from the origin increases to a distance of the order exponential of square of the jet Reynolds number, thus the domain of validity of Schneider solution increases with increasing jet Reynolds number.

Presence of swirl
The presence of swirling motion, i.e.,  is shown not to influence the axial motion given by  provided . If  is very large, the presence of swirl completely alters the motion on the axial plane. For , the azimuthal solution can be solved in terms of the circulation , where . The function  satisfies

See also
Landau–Squire jet
Schlichting jet

References

Flow regimes
Fluid dynamics